The University of Medical Technology, Mandalay (formerly, the Institute of Paramedical Science, Mandalay), located in Patheingyi, Mandalay, is one of three institutions of higher learning specialized in paramedical science in Myanmar. The university offers four-year Bachelor of Medical Technology (B.Med.Tech) degree programs for Health Informatics, Physiotherapy, Medical Imaging Technology, Medical Laboratory Technology. The university accepts 250 students a year.

Programs
The university offers the following four four-year B.Med.Tech programs. Each program accepts 60 students a year. The language of instruction is English.
 Medical Laboratory Technology
 Physiotherapy
  Medical Imaging Technology
 Health Information

Departments
The university consists of 12 academic departments.

Main departments
 Department of Health Information Technology
 Department of Medical Laboratory Technology
 Department of Physiotherapy
 Department of Medical Imaging Technology

Supporting departments

 Department of Biochemistry
 Department of Botany
 Department of Myanmar
 Department of Chemistry
 Department of English
 Department of Microbiology
 Department of Physics
 Department of Physiology
 Department of Zoology
 Department of Anatomy
 Department of Epidemiology
 Department of Biostatistics
  Department of Information Technology

See also
 University of Medical Technology, Yangon
 Defence Services Institute of Nursing and Paramedical Science

References

Universities and colleges in Mandalay
Medical schools in Myanmar
Universities and colleges in Myanmar
Educational institutions established in 1999
1999 establishments in Myanmar